Allen Island may refer to:

 Allen Island (Nunavut), an uninhabited island in the Qikiqtaaluk Region of Nunavut, Canada
 Allen Island (Maine), a private island which is part of St. George, Knox County, Maine
 Allen Island, Queensland, an island in the South Wellesley Islands, Gulf of Carpentaria, Queensland